The Manduadih–Jabalpur Express is an Express train belonging to North Eastern Railway zone that runs between  and  in India. It is currently being operated with 15117/15118 train numbers on a weekly basis.

Service

The 15117/Manduadih–Jabalpur Express has an average speed of 48 km/hr and covers 487 km in 10h 15m. The 15118/Jabalpur–Manduadih Express has an average speed of 46 km/hr and covers 487 km in 10h 35m.

Route and halts 

The important halts of the train are:

Coach composition

The train has standard ICF rakes with a max speed of 110 kmph. The train consists of 13 coaches:

 1 AC III Tier
 4 Sleeper coaches
 6 General Unreserved
 2 Seating cum Luggage Rake

Schedule
 Train runs ones in a week for either side.

Reversals

Traction

Both trains are hauled by a Gonda Loco Shed-based WDM-3A or Itarsi Loco Shed-based WDP-4D diesel locomotive from Varanasi to Jabalpur and vice versa.

Rake sharing

The train shares its rake with 12537/12538 Bapu Dham Superfast Express

See also 

 Jabalpur Junction railway station
 Manduadih railway station
 Bapu Dham Superfast Express

Notes

References

External links 

 15117/Manduadih - Jabalpur Express India Rail Info
 15118/Jabalpur - Manduadih Express India Rail Info

Passenger trains originating from Varanasi
Transport in Jabalpur
Express trains in India
Rail transport in Madhya Pradesh
Railway services introduced in 2014